A GSM Cell ID (CID) is a generally unique number used to identify each base transceiver station (BTS) or sector of a BTS within a location area code (LAC) if not within a GSM network.

In some cases the first or last digit of CID represents cells' Sector ID:
 value 0 is used for omnidirectional antenna,
 values 1, 2, 3 are used to identify sectors of trisector or bisector antennas.

In UMTS, there is a distinction between Cell ID (CID) and UTRAN Cell ID (also called LCID). The UTRAN Cell ID (LCID) is a concatenation of the RNC-ID (12 bits, ID of the Radio Network Controller) and Cell ID (16 bits, unique ID of the Cell). CID is just the Cell ID. The concatenation of both will still be unique but can be confusing in some cellid databases as some store the CID and other store LCID. It makes sense to record them separately as the RNC ID is the same for many cells, the unique element is the CID.

A valid CID ranges from 0 to 65535 (216 − 1) on GSM and CDMA networks and from 0 to 268,435,455 (228 − 1) on UMTS and LTE networks.

Cell ID databases and services 

A number of commercial and public Cell ID databases and services are available:

See also 
Base transceiver station
Field test mode
E-CellID

References

External links
 Combain Positioning Service - cloud service with API to locate wireless devices based on Cell-ID and Wi-Fi 
 LocationAPI by Unwired Labs - Location as an API service to locate devices with WiFi, Cell towers & IP
 Mozilla Location Service - an open service which lets devices determine their location based on network infrastructure like WiFi access points and cell towers
CellMapper - cellular coverage and tower map
OpenCellID - an open source project, aiming to create a complete database of Cell IDs worldwide, with their locations
 cellidfinder - Find the coordinates of any known CellID. 
 Navizon - cloud service with API to locate wireless devices using a global database of WiFi access points and Cell-ID locations
 openBmap - a free and open map of wireless communicating objects (e.g. cellular antenna, Wi-Fi access points...)
 minigps - some information on Cell IDs in china
 Mylnikov GEO - an open source API project. It lets get coordinates of mobile towers with no limits and absolutely free. (Russian)
Base Station Numbering Schemes - Discussion of cellular repeater numerology

GSM standard